The Aden Colony Gazette was the government gazette for the Colony of Aden (1930s to 1963), and of the State of Aden within the Federation of South Arabia (1963-67). It was published at Aden.

It was continued by the Official Gazette of the People's Democratic Republic of Yemen.

See also
List of British colonial gazettes

References

Publications disestablished in 1963
British colonial gazettes
20th century in the Colony of Aden
Government of Yemen